Highway 686 is a highway in the Canadian province of Saskatchewan. It runs from Highway 324 to Highway 378.

Highway 686 passes near Mullingar.

See also 
Roads in Saskatchewan
Transport in Saskatchewan

References 

686